Patharkandi railway station is located in the eastern part of Patharkandi, in Assam, India. The station has one platform.

See also
 Patharkandi
 Patharkandi (Assembly constituency)

References

External links

North East Frontier Railway website

Railway stations in Karimganj district